__notoc__

An animal track is an imprint left behind in soil, snow, or mud, or on some other ground surface, by an animal walking across it. Animal tracks are used by hunters in tracking their prey and by naturalists to identify animals living in a given area.

Books are commonly used to identify animal tracks, which may look different based on the weight of the particular animal and the type of strata in which they are made.

Tracks can be fossilized over millions of years.  It is for this reason we are able to see fossilized dinosaur tracks in some types of rock formations.  These types of fossils are called trace fossils since they are a trace of an animal left behind rather than the animal itself. In paleontology, tracks often preserve as sandstone infill, forming a natural mold of the track.

Gallery

See also
Flukeprint, track of whale on ocean surface
Footprint
Pugmark
Spoor (animal)

References

External links

 Animal Tracks (African)
 Animal Tracks (Dinosaur)
 Animal Tracks (General)
 NatureTracking.com Animal Tracks Website
 Bear-Tracker Animal Tracks Website
 Animal tracks in Mount Rainier National Park
 Tracker Certifications in North America
 Tracker Certifications in Africa

Zoology